Geoff Spring (20 April 1925 – 3 October 1997) was an Australian rules football player who played in the Victorian Football League (VFL) in between 1948 and 1957 for the Richmond Football Club.

References 

 Hogan P: The Tigers Of Old, Richmond FC, Melbourne 1996

External links
 
 

Jack Dyer Medal winners
Richmond Football Club players
Williamstown Football Club players
Australian rules footballers from Victoria (Australia)
1925 births
1997 deaths